Izegrim is a Dutch metal band from Zutphen, founded in 1996 by guitarist Jeroen Wechgelaer (ex-Deluzion) and drummer Joep van Leeuwen (ex-Solstice). Wechgelaer is the only remaining original member.

History

1996-2005
Izegrim was founded in 1996 in Zutphen by guitarist Jeroen Wechgelaer and drummer Joep van Leeuwen (Ränz). Joep invited Kristien Dros (Krisz) to the band as the lead singer, who drew attention by singing with a remarkable grunt. Initially the band experimented with keys too, but after the departure of Anita Luderer (Anita L.) the traditional band line-up (vocals, guitar, bass and drums) was re-assumed.

Drummer Joep was at that stage responsible for the lyrics, which were sung by vocalist Krisz. Guitarist Niels Donninger, who replaced Jeroen van Heuvelen after only a few months, received an offer to play with the band Goddess of Desire and he left Izegrim in 1999. He was then replaced for a short time by Corvin Keurhorst, to be replaced in turn by Carsten Altena in 2000. In 2004, bassist and backing vocalist Anita Borst quit. She was replaced for the same duties by Marloes Voskuil.

2005-present
In 2005, guitarist Bart van Ginkel entered the band to replace Carsten. His fast, aggressive playing style and his ability to play fast, melodic solos enabled the band to grow to a more seasoned sound. When in 2008 drummer Joep was replaced by Ivo Maarhuis and the vocals were handed over form Kristien to bassist Marloes Voskuil, the band underwent their last significant metamorphosis. The lyrics dealt with different content and the members no longer used aliases. This line-up provided the opportunity to give full priority to the band. Due to this, Izegrim started to play more and bigger festivals, on both national and international stages, among which a European tour with the English band Onslaught. In 2009, Izegrim recorded the EP Point Of No Return, with which they got a contract with the French label Listenable Records. Under Listenable Records the band has thus far released three albums, Code Of Consequences (2011), Congress of the Insane (2013) and The Ferryman's End (2016).

Line-up

Current members
Jeroen Wechgelaer - rhythm guitar (1996–present)
Marloes Voskuil - bass (2004–2018), lead vocals (2008–present)
Bas Wijnbergen - bass (2018–present)
Bart van Ginkel - lead guitar (2005–present)
Ivo Maarhuis - drums (2008–present)

Previous members 
Joep van Leeuwen - drums (1998–2008)
Niels Donninger - lead guitar (1998–1999)
Kristien Dros - lead vocals (1998–2008)
Anita Borst - bass (1998–2004)
Corvin Keurhorst - lead guitar (1999–2000)
Carsten Altena - lead guitar (2000–2005)

Timeline

Discography

Studio albums
2002: Guidelines for Genocide
2008: Tribute to Totalitarianism
2011: Code of Consequences
2013: Congress of the Insane
2016: The Ferryman's End

EP's
1999: Bird of Prey
2005: New World Order
2009: Point of No Return2018: Beheaded By TrustDemo's
1998: Most Evil2002: Izegrim''

References

External links
 
 Victim of Honor - Official music video on YouTube

Dutch heavy metal musical groups
Dutch thrash metal musical groups
Musical groups established in 1996
Musical quartets
Zutphen
Listenable Records artists